Geophis nigroalbus is a species of colubrid snake in the subfamily Dipsadinae. It is endemic to the Andes of Colombia. It is sometimes known as the goo-eater snake or  Colombian earth snake.

Distribution
Geophis nigroalbus is known a few localities in the Cordillera Occidental, and it has recently also been discovered in the Magdalena Valley, on the western slopes of Cordillera Oriental.

Description
Geophis nigroalbus is a small species. An adult male specimen from the Magdalena Valley measures  in snout–vent length and has  tail. The upper surfaces of body and tail are uniform black. The venter is cream with black spots while the underside of the tail is black with a few cream patches. There are 134–149 ventral scales in males and 141–157 in females, 42–51 subcaudal scales in males and 37–46 in females, and in total 180–197 segmentals in males and 181–203 in females.

Habitat and conservation
The specimen from the Magdalena Valley was found actively foraging during the night in the leaf litter of a regenerative tropical rain forest after a strong rainfall of about one-hour duration.

Geophis nigroalbus is a rare species and most collections consist of single specimens. Loss and degradation of the forest habitat is a threat to this species.

References

Geophis
Snakes of South America
Reptiles of Colombia
Endemic fauna of Colombia
Taxa named by George Albert Boulenger
Reptiles described in 1908